Nazi usually refers to one of these aspects of the movement that controlled Germany in the 1930s and 1940s:
 Nazism, the ideology of the Nazi Party
 Nazi Germany, the German state ruled by this movement from 1933 to 1945 
 Nazi Party, the ruling political party of Nazi Germany

Nazi may also refer to:

Names
 Nazi, a diminutive in German of the name Ignaz, itself derived from the Latin Ignatius
 Nazi, another name for the Sumerian goddess Nanshe

Places
 Places in Iran:
 Nazi, Chaharmahal and Bakhtiari or Nāzīābād, a village in Kuhrang County, Chaharmahal and Bakhtiari Province, Iran
 Nazi, Markazi or Nāzīyeh, a village in Khomeyn County, Markazi Province, Iran

People with the name
Nazi Boni (1909–1969), a politician from Upper Volta (now Burkina Faso)
Nazí Paikidze (born 1993), Georgian-American chess player
Konstantinos Nazis, Greek singer

Political parties 

 Nasyonal Aktivitede Zinde İnkişaf, a former political party in Turkey abbreviated as NAZİ

See also
Nasi (disambiguation)

:Category:Nazism